An Easterner is a person from the Eastern world.

Easterner can also refer to:
the Loudoun Easterner, a defunct newspaper based in Ashburn, Virginia
Bjǫrn the Easterner, a Viking
Vardan Areveltsi, also known as "Vardan the Easterner"
the Easterner (MP train), a Missouri Pacific train
the Easterner (NYC train), a New York Central train
 Easterners (Korean political faction), a political faction in 16th-century Korea
 a person from the Eastern United States